The 1948 United States presidential election in Texas was held on November 2, 1948. Texas voters chose 23 electors to represent the state in the Electoral College, which chose the president and vice president.

Background
As a former Confederate state, Texas had a history of Jim Crow laws, disenfranchisement of its African-American and Mexican-American populations, and single-party Democratic rule outside a few Unionist German-American counties (chiefly Gillespie and Kendall) of Central Texas. However, President Harry S. Truman was attempting to launch a civil rights bill, involving desegregation of the military, which led to severe opposition from Southern Democrats, who aimed to have South Carolina Governor Strom Thurmond listed as Democratic presidential nominee and Mississippi Governor Fielding Wright as the vice-presidential nominee. Thurmond, whose ticket was formally called the States’ Rights Democratic Party and more popularly known as the Dixiecrats, was leading Truman in early polls even in the major metropolitan counties of Dallas and Harris, which suggested he would claim the state. Texas’ large number of electoral votes made it a coveted prize in Thurmond's quest to take the election into the House of Representatives.

At the time of this poll it remained uncertain as to whether Truman or Thurmond would be the official Democratic nominee in Texas. Unlike Oklahoma, Tennessee, North Carolina or Virginia, Texas did not have a major threat from the Republican Party to block local Democratic support for Thurmond, but it had only a third the proportion of blacks found in Mississippi or South Carolina. More critically, Texas’ party hierarchy was dominated by Truman loyalists, most critically Governor Beauford Jester, and by mid-September it was clear that Truman would be the official Democratic nominee.

Truman campaigned in the Lone Star State during late September, ignoring civil rights and focusing entirely upon Dewey. The President's criticism of Dewey was largely focused on improving the transmission of hydroelectric power from dams at lower rates than Dewey had planned.

Vote
Texas overwhelmingly voted for incumbent Democratic President Harry. S. Truman, who took 66 percent of the state’s vote, to Republican Thomas E. Dewey’s Texas 25.3 percent. Texas was Truman's strongest state, and one of only four in the country which gave him at least sixty percent of the popular vote. Truman carried 246 out of the state's 254 counties, to Dewey’s eight. South Carolina Governor Storm Thurmond, a segregationist Democrat, ran as the Dixiecrat nominee. Despite dominating in the neighboring Deep South, Thurmond received only nine percent of Texas’ popular vote and failed to carry any counties in the state. including those in East Texas, the region in Texas most closely culturally tied to the Deep South. The Dixiecrat ticket did, nonetheless, run second behind Truman in thirty counties. Dewey’s strongest performance was Gillespie County in the Texas Hill Country, which gave him over eighty percent of the vote.

This is one of the last presidential elections in Texas in which the following regions were considered strongholds for the Democratic Party: West Texas, the Texas Panhandle, and the Texas Hill Country. Although several Democratic candidates would win a majority of the counties in these regions in future presidential elections, notably Texas native Lyndon B. Johnson in 1964, these regions were amongst the first in the state to begin splitting their tickets by voting for Republicans on the national level while continuing to vote Democratic at the state level.

This is the last occasion the Plains counties of Ector, Gray, Hansford, Hutchinson, Lipscomb, Midland, Ochiltree, Randall, and Roberts have voted for a Democratic presidential candidate. In the 21st century, these counties typically give over ninety percent of their vote to Republican nominees, while Roberts and Ochiltree have alternated as the nation's most Republican county. Additionally, 1948 constitutes the last election when Gregg County and Smith County in East Texas, plus Edwards County at the western extremity of its namesake plateau, have voted for the Democratic presidential nominee. As a result of Dallas and Harris counties seeing their populations increase as a result of Republican-leaning northern expatriates moving into the state, this would be the last occasion with the exception of Lyndon B. Johnson's landslide win in the state in 1964 that these two counties backed Democratic presidential candidates until Barack Obama won them back in 2008. As of 2020, Dewey remains the last Republican candidate to fail to win at least thirty percent of Texas’s popular vote in a presidential election.

Results

Results by county

Notes

References

1948
1948 Texas elections
Texas